Jody Lavender (born December 29, 1979) is an American stock car racing driver. He formerly competed in the NASCAR Camping World East Series. He was born in Hartsville, South Carolina.

Racing history
Lavender only competed in one Busch Series race, in a family-owned No. 08 Ford. He started 34th in 2003 at Darlington, and finished 23rd, two laps down.

He made his debut in the Craftsman Truck Series in a one-race deal in 2002, driving for Troxell Racing. Starting last at Richmond, he managed to improve to 33rd in the race after a rear end gear let go.

Lavender was picked up by Green Light Racing, and ran 21 of the 25 races in 2003. However, he never cracked the top-10. He finished all but five of his starts. In those sixteen starts that he was running at the end, he finished in the top-20 eleven times. The highlight of the season was a pair of 13th-place finishes at Dover and Memphis. His worst finish of the year was 27th (out of 36 starters per race). Lavender also led one lap of competition at Kentucky, giving him bonus points toward the 17th-place finish he got in points.

Green Light did not pick him up for 2004, and Lavender was not able to find a ride. Lavender drove the number 88 Chevrolet for JBR in the NASCAR Camping World East Series during the 2009 and 2010 seasons.

Motorsports career results

NASCAR
(key) (Bold – Pole position awarded by qualifying time. Italics – Pole position earned by points standings or practice time. * – Most laps led.)

Busch Series

Craftsman Truck Series

References

External links
 

1979 births
Living people
People from Hartsville, South Carolina
NASCAR drivers
CARS Tour drivers
Racing drivers from South Carolina